Peperomia griseoargentea, the ivy peperomia, is a species of flowering plant in the family Piperaceae, native to Brazil.

This evergreen perennial forms rosettes of heart-shaped silver-gray leaves with heavy curved veining. With a minimum temperature of  it is treated as a houseplant in temperate regions. However it may be placed outdoors in the summer months, in a sheltered position with some shade.

It holds the Royal Horticultural Society's Award of Garden Merit.

References 
 

griseoargentea
Flora of Mexico
House plants